Po Chü-I is a crater on Mercury.  Its name was adopted by the International Astronomical Union (IAU) in 1976. Po Chü-I is named for the Chinese poet Bai Juyi.

References

Impact craters on Mercury